Cold Mountain is a 2003 epic period war film written and directed by Anthony Minghella. The film is based on the bestselling 1997 novel of the same name by Charles Frazier. It stars Jude Law, Nicole Kidman, and Renée Zellweger with Eileen Atkins, Brendan Gleeson, Philip Seymour Hoffman, Natalie Portman, Jack White, Giovanni Ribisi, Donald Sutherland, and Ray Winstone in supporting roles. The film tells the story of a wounded deserter from the Confederate army close to the end of the American Civil War, who journeys home to reunite with the woman he loves. The film was a co-production of companies in Italy, Romania, and the United States.

Cold Mountain was released theatrically on December 25, 2003 by Miramax Films. It became a critical and commercial success grossing over $173 million and receiving seven nominations at the 76th Academy Awards, with Zellweger winning 
Best Supporting Actress.

Plot
When North Carolina secedes from the Union on May 20, 1861, the young men of Cold Mountain enlist in the Confederate States Army. Among them is W.P. Inman, a carpenter who has fallen in love with Ada Monroe, the preacher's daughter who came from Charleston, South Carolina to care for her father. Their courtship is interrupted by the war, but they share their first kiss the day Inman leaves for battle. Ada promises to wait for him.

Three years later, Inman fights in the Battle of the Crater and survives. He then comforts a dying acquaintance from Cold Mountain, while fellow soldier Stobrod Thewes plays a tune on his fiddle. Inman is later wounded in a skirmish, and as he lies in a hospital near death, a nurse reads him a letter from Ada, who pleads for Inman to come home to her. Inman recovers and deserts, embarking on a long trek back to Cold Mountain.

Inman encounters corrupt preacher Veasey, and stops him from drowning his pregnant enslaved lover. Exiled from his parish, Veasey joins Inman on his journey. They later meet a young man named Junior, and join him and his family for dinner. Junior betrays them to the Confederate Home Guard, who take Inman and Veasey away along with other deserters. Veasey and the group are killed in a skirmish with Union cavalry, while Inman is left for dead. An elderly hermit living in the woods finds Inman and nurses him back to health. He eventually meets a grieving young widow named Sara and her infant child Ethan, and stays the night at her cabin. The next morning, three Union soldiers arrive demanding food. They take Ethan hostage and try to rape Sara, forcing Inman and Sara to kill them.

Back in Cold Mountain, Ada's father has died, leaving her with no money and little means to run their farm in Black Cove. She survives on the kindness of her neighbors, particularly Esco and Sally Swanger, who eventually send for Ruby Thewes, an experienced farmer (and Stobrod's daughter), to help. Together they bring Black Cove to working order and become close friends. Ada continues to write letters to Inman, hoping they will reunite and renew their romance.

Ada has several tense encounters with Captain Teague, the leader of the local Home Guard who covets Ada and her property, and whose grandfather had once owned much of Cold Mountain. One day, Teague and his men kill Esco, and then torture Sally to coax her deserter sons out of hiding and kill them as well. Ada and Ruby rescue Sally, who is traumatized and rendered mute. The women celebrate Christmas with Stobrod, who has come to Cold Mountain with fellow deserters and musicians Pangle and Georgia.

While camping in the woods one night, Stobrod and Pangle are cornered by Teague and the Guard while Georgia secretly watches; Pangle inadvertently reveals they are deserters, and the Guard shoot Pangle and Stobrod. Georgia escapes and informs Ruby and Ada, who return to the scene to find Pangle dead and Stobrod badly wounded. The women and Stobrod take shelter in an abandoned Cherokee camp. Ada goes hunting for food and is reunited with Inman, who has finally returned to Cold Mountain. They return to the camp, and spend the night consummating their love.

As they head home, Ada and Ruby are surrounded by Teague and his men, having captured and tortured Georgia for their whereabouts. Inman arrives and kills Teague and most of his posse in a gunfight. He then chases Teague's lieutenant, Bosie, and they exchange fast draws. Bosie is killed but Inman is mortally wounded. Ada finds and comforts Inman, who dies in her arms.

Years later, it is revealed that Ada's night with Inman produced a daughter, Grace Inman, and that Ruby has married Georgia bearing two children. With Stobrod and Sally, the family celebrates Easter together at Black Cove.

Cast

Historical accuracy
Several scholars of historical studies reviewed the film for its representation of North Carolina during the Civil War, especially the state's mountainous western region. Their justification is the effect popular media have on national and worldwide perceptions of Appalachian people, particularly southern Appalachians in this case. The opinions vary, but the consensus among them is the historical context of the movie is close to the scholarship.
	
Scholars praised the film for its conformity to the historical scholarship in other subjects, with one saying "the final product should... provide so unflinching a portrayal of the bleak and unsettling realities of a far less familiar version of the Civil War, but one that would be all too recognizable to thousands of hardscrabble southern men and women who lived through it."

One scholar said "some of the best of the soundtrack was not composed for the movie but garnered from the body of time-tested and proven masterpieces of an earlier rural American culture." Such selections were not necessarily performed authentically in the film: the two Sacred Harp songs, although generally authentic to the period and region, contained vocal parts not yet written at that time.

The beginning Battle of the Crater is depicted as happening in broad daylight but it began at 4:44 am with the detonation of the mine.

Production 
In 1997, United Artists bought the rights to Cold Mountain for Anthony Minghella to write and direct, with Sydney Pollack as producer. MGM/United Artists and Miramax Films then announced a deal to produce eight films together, sharing the profits.

As the script was developed, the scope of the film grew from a period love story with a budget of $40 million into an expensive epic. The budget grew to nearly $120 million, with Minghella having trouble finding American landscapes that could pass for 19th-century towns. Tom Cruise, at the time married to Nicole Kidman, wanted to play Inman, but the studio did not want to pay his $20 million demand. To get the budget down, production was moved to Romania, but three weeks before filming began in July 2002, MGM pulled out. Producer Harvey Weinstein was going to cancel the shoot, but with Minghella already in pre-production Weinstein agreed to fund the $80 million project after receiving a $10 million tax break.

Location
Cold Mountain, where the film is set, is a real mountain located within the Pisgah National Forest, Haywood County, North Carolina. It was filmed mostly in Romania, with numerous scenes filmed in Virginia, South Carolina, and North Carolina. The film was one of an increasing number of Hollywood productions made in eastern Europe as a result of lower costs in the region; and because, in this instance, Transylvania having fewer infrastructure like power cables and paved roads was less marked by modern life than the Appalachians.

Editing
The film marked a technological and industry turnaround in editing. Walter Murch edited Cold Mountain on Apple's sub-$1000 Final Cut Pro software using off-the-shelf G4s. This was a leap for such a big budgeted film, where expensive Avid systems are usually the standard editing system. His efforts on the film were documented in the 2005 book Behind the Seen: How Walter Murch Edited Cold Mountain Using Apple's Final Cut Pro and What This Means for Cinema.

Reception

Box office 
Cold Mountain grossed $95.6 million in the United States and Canada and $77.4 million in other territories, for a worldwide total of $173 million. Producer Harvey Weinstein said the film would break-even if it grossed $135 million.

The film made $14.5 million in its opening weekend, finishing third at the box office. It made $11.7 million in its second weekend and $7.9 million in its third, finishing fourth both times.

Critical response 
Cold Mountain was met with overall positive reviews from critics, with Zellweger's performance receiving widespread critical acclaim. According to review aggregator Rotten Tomatoes, 70% of 231 critics gave the film a positive review, with an average rating of 6.70/10. The site's critics consensus states: "The well-crafted Cold Mountain has an epic sweep and captures the horror and brutal hardship of war." On Metacritic, the film was assigned a weighted average score of 73 out of 100 based on 41 critics, indicating "generally favorable reviews." Audiences surveyed by CinemaScore gave the film an average grade of B+ on scale of A+ to F.

Roger Ebert gave the film three stars out of four, noting that "It evokes a backwater of the Civil War with rare beauty, and lights up with an assortment of colorful supporting characters." Richard Corliss, film critic for Time, gave the film a positive review. He called it "A grand and poignant movie epic about what is lost in war and what's worth saving in life. It is also a rare blend of purity and maturity—the year's most rapturous love story." In his movie guide, Leonard Maltin gave the film 3 1/2 stars out of 4, writing "Minghella's adaptation of the Charles Frazier best-seller captures both the grimness of battle and the starkness of life on the home front in the South," and concluded the film was "Meticulously crafted" with "First-rate performances all around."

Soundtrack

Cold Mountain: Music from the Motion Picture shares producer T Bone Burnett with the soundtrack for O Brother, Where Art Thou?, a largely old-time and folk album with limited radio play that still enjoyed commercial success, and garnered a Grammy. As a result, comparisons were drawn between the two albums. The soundtrack, however, also employs many folk and blues elements.

It features songs written by Jack White of The White Stripes (who also appeared in the film in the role of Georgia), Elvis Costello and Sting. Costello and Sting's contributions, "The Scarlet Tide" and "You Will Be My Ain True Love", were both nominated for the Academy Award for Best Original Song and featured vocals by bluegrass singer Alison Krauss. Gabriel Yared's Oscar-nominated score is represented by four tracks amounting to approximately fifteen minutes of music.

Awards

See also
 Captain Daniel Ellis

References

Further reading
 Tibbetts, John C., and James M. Welsh, eds. The Encyclopedia of Novels Into Film (2nd ed. 2005) pp 63–66.

External links

 
 
 
 
 
 

2000s romance films
2003 films
2000s war films
American Civil War films
BAFTA winners (films)
2000s English-language films
English-language Italian films
English-language Romanian films
Films about deserters
Films based on American novels
Films based on the Odyssey
Films directed by Anthony Minghella
Films featuring a Best Supporting Actress Academy Award-winning performance
Films featuring a Best Supporting Actress Golden Globe-winning performance
Films set in 1864
Films set in North Carolina
Films shot in North Carolina
Films shot in South Carolina
Films shot in Virginia
Films shot in Romania
Miramax films
War romance films
Films scored by Gabriel Yared
Films produced by Sydney Pollack
2000s American films